Siquirres River Basin Protected Zone, is a protected area in Costa Rica, managed under the Caribbean La Amistad Conservation Area, it was created in 1995 by decree 24785-MIRENEM.

References 

Nature reserves in Costa Rica
Protected areas established in 1995